Beast of Berlin may refer to:

 The Kaiser, the Beast of Berlin, a World War I propaganda film
 Hitler, Beast of Berlin, a World War II propaganda film
 Beasts of Berlin, members of the People's Defense Force in the fictional Marvel Universe